Ezekiel Forman Chambers (February 28, 1788January 30, 1867) was an American politician.

Born in Chestertown, Maryland, Chambers was graduated from Washington College at Chestertown in 1805.  He studied law, was admitted to the bar in 1808, and commenced practice in Chestertown.  Chambers served during the War of 1812 as a captain of militia, commanding a company at the Battle of Caulk's Field in 1814. He attained the rank of brigadier general of militia after the war.  In 1822, Chambers served in the Maryland State Senate.

Chambers was elected to the United States Senate to fill the vacancy caused by the resignation of Edward Lloyd.  He was reelected in 1831 and served from January 24, 1826, until his own resignation on December 20, 1834.  In the Senate, Chambers served as chairman of the Committee on the District of Columbia (Twenty-first through Twenty-third Congresses).

After his tenure in the Senate, Chambers served as presiding judge of the second judicial circuit of Maryland and judge of the Maryland Court of Appeals from 1834 to 1851, having been appointed to the seat vacated by the resignation of Richard Tilghman Earle. He was unsuccessful Democratic candidate for Governor of Maryland in 1864, and died in Chestertown in 1867.  He was interred in Chester Cemetery.

Chambers was a slave owner.

See also 
 Widehall (1769-1770), a mansion in Chestertown, Maryland. Chambers's home from 1822 to 1867.

References

External links 

1788 births
1867 deaths
People from Chestertown, Maryland
National Republican Party United States senators from Maryland
Maryland Democrats
Judges of the Maryland Court of Appeals
American slave owners
19th-century American judges
Washington College alumni
American militia generals
American militiamen in the War of 1812
People from Maryland in the War of 1812
United States senators who owned slaves